Bartholomew Green may refer to:
Bartholomew Green (martyr) (1530–1556), English Protestant martyr
Bartholomew Green (printer, born 1666), American printer and publisher
Bartholomew Green (printer, born 1699) (1699–1751), son of Bartholomew Green, printer of the Boston News-Letter
Bartholomew Green, Essex, a hamlet in Felsted, England

Green, Bartholomew